Veatriki Sarri (born 1 January 1998) is a Greek professional footballer who plays as a forward for English club Brighton & Hove Albion in the FA Women's Super League.

Early life
Sarri grew up in Crete and played football with her brother.

Career

Sarri moved to England to attend university in Leeds, and played for Leeds United Ladies in 2017.

She moved to Fylde Ladies, competing for the Lancashire club during the 2017–18 season. In September 2017, she suffered an injury in a game against Guiseley Vixens which required hospital treatment and kept her out of the game for a whole season.

After coming back from injury, Sarri signed for Sheffield United in January 2019.

Sarri moved to Birmingham City of the FA WSL in January 2021. In doing so she became the first Greek player in the WSL. She turned down a new contract with the club in May 2022.

In July 2022, Sarri moved to Brighton & Hove Albion on a two-year deal, joining Hope Powell's squad following Birmingham City's relegation from the Women's Super League.

International goals

Honours
AO Chania
 C Division (1): 2010/11
 B Division (1): 2012/13

Individual
 PSAPP Best Greek Female Player Abroad: 2022

References

External links 
 

1998 births
Living people
Greek women's footballers
Greece women's international footballers
Women's association football forwards
Expatriate women's footballers in England
Greek expatriate women's footballers
Greek expatriate sportspeople in England
Leeds United Women F.C. players
Sheffield United W.F.C. players
FA Women's National League players
Fylde Ladies F.C. players
Brighton & Hove Albion W.F.C. players